The 1997–98 Luxembourg Cup was the fifth playing of the Luxembourg Cup ice hockey tournament. Five teams participated in the tournament, which was won by the Chiefs Leuven.

First round

Final
 Chiefs Leuven - Tornado Luxembourg 8:5

External links 
 Season on hockeyarchives.info

Luxembourg Cup
Luxembourg Cup (ice hockey) seasons